Steilacoom is a town in Pierce County, Washington, United States. The population was 6,727 at the 2020 census. Steilacoom incorporated in 1854 and became the first incorporated town in what is now the state of Washington. It has also become a bedroom community for service members stationed at Joint Base Lewis–McChord.

Based on per capita income, Steilacoom ranks 61st of 522 areas ranked in the state of Washington.

Name
The origin of the name "Steilacoom" is unclear. According to the Legacy Washington program, the town's name is derived from a Native American word meaning "little pink flower." Another possibility is that it was named by fur traders with the Hudson's Bay Company (HBC) and is an adaptation of Tail-a-Koom, the name of a Native American chief. In 1824, chief factor John Work called the town "Chilacoom". Another early spelling was "Chelakom". The Town of Steilacoom says it was named after the Steilacoom tribe, especially their main village in the Tacoma area, located on Chambers Bay. Robert Hitchman noted in Place Names of Washington that Steilacoom Creek, which feeds into Chambers Creek, held the name before the town.

History
The Steilacoom people, a Coast Salish tribe, lived in what became the city of Steilacoom. Their main village was called Scht’ləqʷəm, later anglicized as Steilacoom. William Bright says the name comes from the Southern Coast Salish subgroup /č'tílqʷəbš/, anglicized as "Steilacoom".

European-American settlement at Steilacoom began with Lafayette Balch, a sea captain from Maine, and the town was officially incorporated in 1854. It is the oldest incorporated town in Washington. It has four individual buildings and sites listed on the National Register of Historic Places, including the oldest Catholic Church in the state, the first Protestant Church north of the Columbia River, as well as the Steilacoom Historic District, with 68 contributing properties.

Steilacoom's main source of early prosperity was the processing and export of lumber to San Francisco.  When the United States Congress established the Washington Territory on March 2, 1853, Governor Isaac Stevens chose Steilacoom as the seat of Pierce County.

Steilacoom had the first jail in Washington and the first sawmill.  The City of Lakewood has developed next to it, and the city is home to one of the two major state-run mental health facilities, Western State Hospital, on the site of what was once Fort Steilacoom.

Geography
Steilacoom is located at  (47.170019, -122.594349).

Transportation
There are no state highways in Steilacoom. Drivers can access Interstate 5 or State Route 512 by driving through the adjacent city of Lakewood.

BNSF operates a railroad running along Steilacoom's shoreline, with the Union Pacific Railroad having trackage rights on this line as well. However, there is no active station in the city and passenger trains do not stop there. Passenger service to the city ended in 1971. With the November 18, 2021 opening of the Point Defiance bypass route, Amtrak passenger service is now on an inland line from Tacoma through South Tacoma, Lakewood and DuPont, essentially parallel to Interstate 5. With this new route in operation, Steilacoom's rail line is now for freight only.

Pierce County maintains a Steilacoom-Anderson Island Ferry which departs from Steilacoom and serves Anderson and Ketron islands.

Education
Public schools are operated by the Steilacoom Historical School District #1, which was first established in 1854.

Steilacoom High School is the district's comprehensive high school.

Demographics

2010 census
As of the census of 2010, there were 5,985 people, 2,559 households, and 1,715 families residing in the town. The racial makeup of the town was 77.1% White, 4.7% African American, 0.7% Native American, 7.3% Asian, 1.4% Pacific Islander, 1.5% from other races, and 7.3% from two or more races. Hispanic or Latino of any race were 6.7% of the population.

There were 2,559 households, of which 26.9% had children under the age of 18 living with them, 50.3% were married couples living together, 12.2% had a female householder with no husband present, 4.5% had a male householder with no wife present, and 33.0% were non-families. 26.7% of all households were made up of individuals, and 8.5% had someone living alone who was 65 years of age or older. The average household size was 2.34 and the average family size was 2.79.

The median age in the town was 42.4 years. 20.3% of residents were under the age of 18; 9.2% were between the ages of 18 and 24; 23.5% were from 25 to 44; 29.6% were from 45 to 64; and 17.4% were 65 years of age or older. The gender makeup of the town was 48.3% male and 51.7% female.

2000 census
As of the census of 2000, there were 6,049 people, 2,570 households, and 1,721 families residing in the town. The population density was 2,916.9 people per square mile (1,128.3/km2). There were 2,674 housing units at an average density of 1,289.4 per square mile (498.8/km2). The racial makeup of the town was 78.46% White, 6.70% African American, 0.84% Native American, 5.87% Asian, 0.61% Pacific Islander, 1.65% from other races, and 5.87% from two or more races. Hispanic or Latino of any race were 5.41% of the population.

There were 2,570 households, out of which 27.8% had children under the age of 18 living with them, 53.8% were married couples living together, 9.8% had a female householder with no husband present, and 33.0% were non-families. 26.5% of all households were made up of individuals, and 7.2% had someone living alone who was 65 years of age or older.  The average household size was 2.35 and the average family size was 2.83.

In the town, the age distribution of the population showed 22.8% under the age of 18, 9.2% from 18 to 24, 28.6% from 25 to 44, 26.0% from 45 to 64, and 13.3% who were 65 years of age or older. The median age was 38 years. For every 100 females, there were 96.5 males. For every 100 females age 18 and over, there were 93.4 males.

The median income for a household in the town was $46,113, and the median income for a family was $54,725. Males had a median income of $40,505 versus $34,136 for females. The per capita income for the town was $27,124. About 6.9% of families and 8.1% of the population were below the poverty line, including 15.0% of those under age 18 and 3.7% of those age 65 or over.

Notable residents
Clara Antoinette McCarty Wilt, the first graduate (1876) from the University of Washington, was born in Steilacoom.

References

External links

 Town of Steilacoom
 Steilacoom Historical Museum Association
 Steilacoom Historical School District #1
 
 McNeil Island Corrections Center

Towns in Pierce County, Washington
Towns in Washington (state)
1854 establishments in Washington Territory